William Frederick Gibbons (born December 16, 1949) is an American rock musician, best known as the guitarist and primary vocalist of ZZ Top. He began his career in the Moving Sidewalks, who recorded Flash (1968) and opened four dates for the Jimi Hendrix Experience. Gibbons formed ZZ Top in late 1969 and released ZZ Top's First Album in early 1971. He has also maintained a solo career in recent years, starting with his first album Perfectamundo (2015).

Gibbons has made appearances with other artists and acted on television shows, most notably in Bones. In 2001, Rolling Stone named him the 32nd greatest guitarist of all time.

Early life 
Gibbons was born to Frederick Royal ("Freddie") and Lorraine (née Duffy) Gibbons in the Tanglewood neighborhood of Houston, Texas. His father was an entertainer, orchestra conductor, and concert pianist who worked alongside his second cousin, art director Cedric Gibbons, for Samuel Goldwyn at MGM Studios. When Gibbons was five years old, his mother took him and his sister to see Elvis Presley. At age seven, Gibbons's father took him to a BB King recording session. A percussionist at first, Gibbons was sent by his father to New York City to study with Tito Puente. In 1962, Gibbons received his first electric guitar following his 13th birthday, a sunburst Gibson Melody Maker, accompanied by a Fender Champ amplifier, and was influenced by guitarists such as Jimmy Reed.

While attending Warner Brothers' art school in Hollywood, California, Gibbons engaged with his first bands including the Saints, Billy G & the Blueflames, and the Coachmen. By 18, Gibbons formed an artfully designed band, conceptually inspired by friend and fellow musician, Roky Erickson and the 13th Floor Elevators, naming the group the Moving Sidewalks, penning the hit single "99th Floor", and engaging in a friendship with Jimi Hendrix.

Musical career

Moving Sidewalks 

Gibbons founded the Texas psychedelic group the Moving Sidewalks, which recorded several singles and one full-length album, Flash. Gibbons and the Moving Sidewalks came to prominence opening for the Jimi Hendrix Experience during Hendrix's first American tour as a headliner. Also notable was the Gibbons-penned song, "99th Floor", its title a nod to the influence on Gibbons of fellow Texans and pioneering psychedelic band the 13th Floor Elevators. He has also commented during live performances while playing the string-bending intro to "Foxy Lady" that Hendrix taught him how to play when Gibbons was "about 17" in Dallas.

ZZ Top 

Gibbons formed ZZ Top in late 1969, and quickly settled on bassist/vocalist Dusty Hill and drummer Frank "Rube" Beard, both members of the band American Blues. After honing their trademark blues-rock style, they released ZZ Top's First Album on London Records in 1971. Although all three members were born in 1949, Gibbons was the youngest member of the band.

Solo career 
On July 31, 2015 it was announced that Gibbons' solo project will be named Billy Gibbons and the BFG's featuring musicians Mike Flanigin, GG Maartine (née Martine GuiGui), Joe Hardy and Greg Morrow. Their debut album, Perfectamundo, was released on November 6, 2015.

Gibbons' second solo album, The Big Bad Blues, was released on September 21, 2018 via Concord Records. At the 40th Blues Music Awards in May 2019, the album was named as 'Blues Rock Album of the Year'.

In a 2019 interview with Guitar World, Gibbons said that he was already starting to work on his next solo release: "I think we're going to call it Hardware, and that's in tribute to Joe Hardy, our stalwart engineer for four decades. He recently passed on, but in his wake he left the instruction manual -- 'Here's how to do it.' We're still trying to get to the back chapters. It goes deep." The album was released in 2021.

Other music-related appearances 
Gibbons added guitar to the track "Dias Raros" from Diamante Eléctrico of Bogotá, Colombia.

Gibbons played the first slide guitar lead on the song "Dead End Streets" on Al Jourgensen of Ministry's side project Revolting Cocks album Cocked and Loaded.

He wrote, played guitar on and sang "Willin' for Satisfaction" from Def Leppard guitarist Vivian Campbell's 2005 solo album Two Sides of If.

Gibbons collaborated with the Queens of the Stone Age on the song "Burn the Witch" from the album Lullabies to Paralyze. ZZ Top's "Precious and Grace" was recorded with lead vocals provided by Mark Lanegan as a bonus track for the album. Gibbons has claimed this was one of his favorite collaborations and "Precious and Grace" was later added back into ZZ Top's set lists. Gibbons was selected to guest the follow-up album Era Vulgaris but was unable due to scheduling conflicts.

In 2007, Gibbons was featured in the documentary feature film The 1959 Burst alongside Les Paul guitar legends like Slash, Rick Nielsen and Eric Johnson

Together with the Raconteurs Gibbons performed at the 2006 MTV Video Music Awards. Gibbons was part of an ensemble chosen to play with the band, which included Lou Reed and Jim Jarmusch. The performance was heavily edited and cut short by MTV for broadcast. 

Gibbons was one of several artists to join B.B. King on the song "Tired of Your Jive", from the B.B. King & Friends album.

Gibbons appeared on Nickelback's album All the Right Reasons on the songs "Follow You Home", "Fight for All the Wrong Reasons" and "Rockstar".

Gibbons performed with Hank Williams III on the song "Trashville" from his album Lovesick, Broke and Driftin'.

Gibbons collaborated with Les Paul with his Les Paul & Friends American Made, World Played track "Bad Case of Loving You". Gibbons also performed guitar with John Mayall & Friends' track "Put It Right Back" from the album Along for the Ride. He was the first artist to appear on stage at Cleveland's State theater in November 2008 at the American Music Master Tribute to Les Paul, honoring the guitar and recording innovator, who died a few months later.

Gibbons was a guest vocalist on Kid Rock's "Hillbilly Stomp" from the album Kid Rock.

Gibbons was the guitarist during singer Luis Fonsi's presentation at the seventh Latin Grammy awards held in Madison Square Garden, New York, on November 2, 2006.

Gibbons sang background vocals on Sammy Hagar's 2008 CD Cosmic Universal Fashion during the song "Switch on the Light".

Gibbons collaborated with Ronnie Dunn, of Brooks & Dunn fame, for Dunn's first solo work, playing guitar and singing along on the song, "Honky Tonk Stomp".

Gibbons played guitar on "Broke Down on the Brazos", the opening track of Gov't Mule's 2009 album By a Thread.

Gibbons played guitar on "Run Rudolph Run", the third track of We Wish you a Metal Xmas and a Headbanging New Year compilation.

Gibbons joined Jeff Beck onstage at the 2009 25th Anniversary Rock & Roll Hall of Fame Concert with a version of Jimi Hendrix's "Foxy Lady".

Gibbons made a special guest appearance behind Roky Erickson on Austin City Limits taped on November 12, 2007, and originally aired January 12, 2008. (ACL Season 33, Episode 12).

Gibbons plays lead guitar on two songs from the 2008 Everlast album Love, War and the Ghost of Whitey Ford: "Stone in My Hand" and "Anyone".

On January 22, 2010, Gibbons joined Ben Harper, Beck, Conan O'Brien and others on the final episode of The Tonight Show with Conan O'Brien playing a Will Ferrell-led rendition of Lynyrd Skynyrd's "Free Bird".

On February 19, 2011, Gibbons appeared as a guest judge at the 5th Annual Misprint Beard and Moustache Contest at the Mohawk Club in Austin, Texas.

On December 15, 2012, Gibbons made a guest appearance at Social Distortion's concert at the House of Blues on the Sunset Strip. Frontman Mike Ness brought him out for two songs, "Drug Train" and "Black Magic". On November 19, 2014, Gibbons performed "Baby Please Don't Go" at the Vaclav Havel bust dedication ceremony in the US Capitol.

In 2020, Gibbons was featured playing guitar on Chapel Hart's single titled "Jesus & Alcohol" and also plays the role of a pastor in the music video.

In November 2021, Gibbons appeared alongside Dion DiMucci on "My Stomping Ground" which is featured in DiMucci's "Stomping Ground" album.

Other projects

Television 
Gibbons had a recurring role on the Fox network TV series Bones, appearing in seven episodes over nine years. He plays a fictionalized version of himself, as the father of Michaela Conlin's character, Angela Pearly Gates Montenegro. He is never referred to by name on the show, though; every mention is limited to "Angela's father". Conlin's character's middle name is the same as Gibbons' Les Paul guitar. Gibbons's character is extremely protective of his daughter, and he often "threatens" or "haunts" Angela's husband and colleague Dr. Jack Hodgins, telling him that if he hurts Angela, he will pay. When Angela and Hodgins first broke up, he drugged and kidnapped Hodgins, during which time he also gave him a tattoo of Angela's face on his left deltoid area. After Angela discovers the tattoo, she informs Hodgins she wants it removed (he never removed it) and angrily exclaimed when she discovered it was her dad's doing, "I am so going to kick his Texan bad ass."

He has appeared in several other episodes of Bones, including one where he asks Hodgins to help him recover his car from some "biker hoods". In his next appearance, he argued with Hodgins over baby names. He wanted the child to be named "Staccato Mamba", which came to him in a song, while Angela and Hodgins wanted to name him "Michael Vincent". (Parents and grandfather compromised on "Michael Staccato".) At the end of the episode, Hodgins discovers he has yet another tattoo on his right biceps, this time of his father-in-law with the word "Daddy" across Gibbons' beard (at which point Gibbons told Hodgins that celebratory tequila and he do not seem to mix). In a later episode, he asks to babysit his grandson Michael, pointing out that Angela had spent many nights when she was a baby sleeping soundly backstage while he played to sold-out stadiums. After initial reluctance of Angela and Hodgins, they agree due to the need to get some sleep, as Michael will not stop crying and go to sleep. Gibbons solves the problem by discovering the music Michael likes, including blues and boogie rock, such as ZZ Top's "Hi Fi Mama".

Gibbons voiced a character in episode 60 of Metalocalypse.

Gibbons, along with his ZZ Top bandmates Dusty Hill and Frank Beard, voiced a fictionalized version of himself in Fox's animated show King of the Hill, which is set in the fictional town of Arlen, Texas. In the show, Dusty Hill is said to be a cousin of the show's main character, Hank Hill.

Gibbons appeared as a dining room guest in the season-13 episode of Hell's Kitchen.

Books 
Although first published in 2005, Billy F Gibbons: Rock + Roll Gearhead received an expanded re-release from Motorbooks in 2020 for the 50th anniversary of ZZ Top. Gibbons joined author Tom Vickers and photographer David Perry which offers a look at his collection of cars and guitars, including the famous Eliminator Ford 1933 coupe that appeared on the cover of ZZ Top's 1983 album of the same name. The book is ultimately divided into three sections: The Life, The Cars, and The Guitars.

BFG Brand sauces 
In 2011, Gibbons joined with Texas-based Mojo Products, LLC, to launch a line of hot sauces, barbecue sauces, and other products with his own personal branding, "BFG Brand". The sauces were sold as BFG No. 44 via his personal website.

In late 2012, Gibbons was featured in a series of television commercials for Fiesta Mart, a Texas supermarket chain. Some of the BFG Brand sauces were seen in these commercials.

The Holy Grail 
In 2018, Billy Gibbons teamed up with John Fogerty; the two guitar players are planning a summer tour under "The Holy Grail" title. John Fogerty wrote a song with the title "The Holy Grail" which Gibbons has appeared on, adding his vocals and some guitar, Billy had this to say to 'Billboard Magazine': "It's not an overstatement to say that writing a song with John Fogerty is a genuine bonus. It's fair to say that John and I are both pumped about our collaboration and we think this new one called 'The Holy Grail' holds true with some great storytelling and some solid guitarist movin' the number right along. It begs a shout of, 'Turn it up!'" The new single "The Holy Grail" was released on June 8, 2018.

Equipment

Guitars 
Gibbons' primarily plays Gibson guitars. His first guitar was a sunburst 1962 Gibson Melody Maker. In 1968, Gibbons acquired a sunburst 1959 Gibson Les Paul Standard guitar from a farmer in Houston, Texas, for $250. The guitar was named Pearly Gates, a name taken from the dangerous-to-drive rolling-wreck auto that he sold to buy the guitar.  The guitar has become the foundation/benchmark of every ZZ Top album since the group formed in 1969.

Gibbons also plays Fender guitars. During his stint in the Moving Sidewalks, Gibbons used a white 1963 Fender Jazzmaster and Fender Esquire. He has also used an extremely rare "Gretsch Jupiter Thunderbird" given to him by Bo Diddley. The use of this guitar (beginning with the 2003 ZZ Top album Mescalero) inspired a signature production model, the Gretsch Billy-Bo Jupiter Thunderbird. For Mescalero, Gibbons also relied heavily on Ulrich Teuffel's futuristic Birdfish guitar, saying it was second only to Pearly Gates. According to Gibbons, "It really shines on Mescalero because of that dirty, raunchy tone. I defy any other instrument, besides these odd-ball things, to get that crazy." Gibbons recorded Eliminator using a Dean ML guitar.

For the music video for the 1983 single "Legs", Gibbons and Hill used matching spinning sheepskin fur guitars made by Dean Zelinsky of Dean Guitars. The guitars are attached to the belt buckles with a rotary electrical contact and strap mount, allowing them to spin. Gibbons credited the spinning idea to Moving Sidewalks bassist Don Summers.

Gibbons worked with Thomas Nilsen of Cream T Pickups to create the BFG Banger humbucker pickup. At the 2010 Winter NAMM show, Dunlop Manufacturing and Gibbons unveiled a new line of guitar accessories, Rev. Willy's. These include Gibbons inspired picks, strings, and slides.

Strings 
Gibbons notably uses strings in an extra light gauge of .07-.09-.11-.20-.30-.38 on his guitars and has a signature set manufactured and sold by Dunlop known as "Rev. Willy's Mexican Lottery Brand". The company also manufactures other gauges of these strings.

Originally a user of heavy gauge strings in ZZ Top's earliest days, Gibbons switched to light strings after playing a show with B.B. King. King asked to play Gibbons' guitar, which he gladly obliged. After playing it, King noticed the heavy strings, handed the guitar back to Gibbons and asked, "Why you working so hard?". Gibbons had assumed that the classic blues sound came from playing heavy gauge strings, but King told him otherwise and advised him to put light gauge strings on his guitar instead.

Amplifiers 
Gibbons has used a variety of Marshall products, including the JCM 900 Dual Reverb, Bluesbreaker, JTM45, Major, and Lead 12. Recently, his live touring rack consists of the JMP-1 Preamp, combined with power amps such as the Valvestate 120 or the 9200 model. Gibbons has a large collection of vintage Fender amplifiers (his first amp was a Fender Champ), and collects Fender Dual Professionals. Other Fenders he has used include a Fender Bassman and Fender Tweed Deluxe. Gibbons now uses Magnatone amplifiers.

Personal life 
On December 14, 2005, Gibbons married longtime girlfriend Gilligan Stillwater (born Ellen J. Oetjen).

Gibbons is an avid car collector and custom car enthusiast with an extensive collection that includes a 1948 Cadillac Series 62 (known as CadZZilla), a 1962 Chevrolet Impala (known as "Slampala"), a 1950 Ford Business Coupe, and a 1958 Ford Thunderbird. One of his earliest custom cars, a 1933 Ford Coupe (known as "Eliminator"), was featured in three of ZZ Top's music videos and is also on the cover of their 1983 album, also titled Eliminator. Gibbons also published a book in 2011 about his love of cars and guitars titled Billy F Gibbons: Rock + Roll Gearhead. The November 2014 issue of Guitar World magazine featured an interview with Gibbons and fellow guitarist Jeff Beck about their mutual appreciation of "cars, guitars, and everything in between".

For several years, Gibbons has appeared wearing a braided-cloth cap rather than his familiar Stetson hat. During a visit to Vienna, he met the chief of the Bamileke people from Cameroon, with whom he traded the hat for the cap.

Discography

Studio albums

Singles

As lead artist

As featured artist

Appearances on various artists compilations

Music videos

References

External links 

ZZ Top official website
Official Moving Sidewalks website

1949 births
American blues guitarists
American male guitarists
American rock guitarists
Blues rock musicians
Lee High School (Houston, Texas) alumni
Living people
Slide guitarists
ZZ Top members
Lead guitarists
Musicians from Houston
Texas blues musicians
Gold Star Records artists
Guitarists from Texas
20th-century American guitarists
21st-century American guitarists
American bass-baritones